HMS Sabrina was an 18-gun Royal Navy ship-sloop of the Cormorant-class, launched in 1806 at Southampton. She seems to have had a surprisingly uneventful career before the Admiralty sold her in 1816.

Design
Sabrina was one of the second batch of Cormorant-class ship-sloops. As such she carried 32-pounder carronades in her main battery instead of 6-pounder guns. In 1810 she was reclassed as a 20-gun post-ship, and again re-rated as 24 guns in 1816, just before she was sold. Under the rating system of the day her number of guns could be largely nominal (in this case the number of long guns she would have carried had she been so-armed); the re-rating included her carronades in the total and did not involve any actual change to her armament.

Service
Sabrina was commissioned under Commander Edward Kittoe in September 1806 and he sailed her to the Mediterranean on 4 January 1807. At some point, her boats and those of her squadron attacked a Spanish flotilla. A subsequent expedition saw her boats and those of Chiffonne cut out a brig and a schooner under the guns of a 4-gun battery on the south coast of Spain.

In early 1809 Kittoe sailed Sabrina to Cartagena, Colombia, bringing the news that Spain and England had signed a peace. Some dual citizens (Anglo-Americans) held prisoner in Colombia asked him to intercede with the viceroy for their freedom, which he did, but to no avail, as they had been incarcerated at the behest of the Captain General of Caracas.

In 1809 she participated in the ill-fated Walcheren Campaign. At one point during the campaign, she served as the flagship for Admiral Keats. During the campaign Rear Admiral William Albany Ottway appointed Commander Abraham Lowe to take command of her.

Sabrina then came under the command of Commander James Tillard, who sailed her for Portugal on 20 July.

In October 1810 Sabrina escorted a convoy of transport ships from Oporto to Lisbon, transferring about 4000 French prisoners that Colonel Trant's raid captured at Coimbra.

Sabrina Island: During June and July 1811 a volcanic eruption in the sea formed a new island off São Miguel Island. Commander Tillard went ashore on 4 July and claimed the island for Great Britain, naming it Sabrina Island. He later wrote a description of what he had seen and done for the Philosophical Transactions of the Royal Society. The claiming of the island gave rise to considerable diplomatic wrangling that proved moot when the island subsided into the sea a few months later.

In November 1811 Captain the Honourable William Walpole took command and sailed Sabrina for Portugal on 19 November. On 30 December Sabrina and  captured Princess de Beira (or Princess Beira). A prize money notice, however, names Tillard as captain of Sabrina, which is inconsistent with Walpole having replaced Tillard in November.

On 13 January 1812, Sabrina and Vesta captured the slave schooner Pepe off the coast of Africa.

In May command passed to Captain Alexander R. MacKenzie, who sailed her to Portugal. Sabrina shared with many vessels in the proceeds of the detention on 5 August, of Asia.

On 5 January 1813, Sabrina and  detained Edward and Albert.

Fate
The Principal Officers and Commissioners of His Majesty's Navy offered the "Sabrina sloop, of 427 tons", lying at Deptford, for sale on 18 April. Sabrina was sold on 18 April 1816 at Portsmouth.

Notes

Citations

References
Admiralty (1835) The Navy List. (Great Britain; H.M. Stationery Office).
The American historical review, "Diary and Letters of Henry Ingersoll", Volume 3.
Jamleson, Alexander, ed. (1821) "Captain Tillard's Account of the Volcanic Isle of Sabrina", in Universal science or the cabinet of nature and art, comprising above one thousand entertaining and instructive facts and experiments. Vol 1. (G. & W. B. Whittaker).

External links

Cormorant-class ship-sloops
Ships built in Southampton
1806 ships